Sergio Herrera Pirón (born 5 June 1993) is a Spanish footballer who plays for CA Osasuna as a goalkeeper.

Football career
Born in Miranda de Ebro, Burgos, Castile and León, Herrera finished his graduation with Deportivo Alavés' youth setup, and made his senior debuts with the reserves in the 2011–12 campaign, in Tercera División. On 28 November 2012 he made his first team debut, starting in a 1–3 Copa del Rey away defeat against FC Barcelona.

Herrera appeared in only one further match with the main squad (who achieved promotion to Segunda División) before being loaned out to CD Laudio on 23 July 2013. Upon his return, he was again assigned to the B-team in the fourth level.

On 2 July 2015 Herrera signed for SD Amorebieta in Segunda División B. On 22 June of the following year, after being a regular starter, he signed a three-year contract with SD Huesca in the second tier.

On 20 August 2016 Herrera made his professional debut, starting and keeping a clean sheet in a 0–0 away draw against AD Alcorcón. He became an undisputed starter for the club, overtaking new signings Javi Jiménez (who was also injured) and Queco Piña.

On 12 July 2017 Herrera signed a four-year deal with CA Osasuna, freshly relegated from La Liga, for a fee of € 300,000. He spent the first half of the 2018–19 campaign nursing a knee injury, and contributed rarely to his team's return to the top tier.

Career statistics

Club

Honours
Alaves
Segunda División B: 2012–13

Osasuna
Segunda División: 2018–19

References

External links

1993 births
Living people
People from Miranda de Ebro
Sportspeople from the Province of Burgos
Spanish footballers
Footballers from Castile and León
Association football goalkeepers
La Liga players
Segunda División players
Segunda División B players
Tercera División players
Deportivo Alavés B players
Deportivo Alavés players
CD Laudio players
SD Amorebieta footballers
SD Huesca footballers
CA Osasuna players